Chao Ho may refer to:

 Chinese cruiser Zhào Hé, a protected cruiser in the Chinese fleet
 Zhào Hé class cruiser, a class of protected cruisers